The Battle of Snyder's Bluff or Snyder's Mill was fought from April 29 to May 1, 1863, during the Vicksburg Campaign of the American Civil War. Union forces under Maj. Gen. William T. Sherman conducted a feint against Confederate units holding the bluff, which was easily repelled.

Battle

To ensure that troops were not withdrawn to Grand Gulf to assist Confederates there, a combined Union Army–Navy force feigned an attack on Snyder's Bluff, Mississippi. After noon on April 29, Lt. Cdr. K. Randolph Breese, with his eight gunboats and ten transports carrying Maj. Gen. Francis Blair's division, inched up the Yazoo River to the mouth of Chickasaw Bayou where they spent the night. At 9 a.m. the next morning, the force, minus one gunboat, continued upriver to Drumgould's Bluff and engaged the enemy batteries. During the fighting, the Choctaw suffered more than fifty hits, but no casualties occurred. Around 6 p.m., the troops disembarked and marched along Blake's Levee toward the guns. As they neared Drumgould's Bluff, a battery opened on them. The Union advance halted and, after dark, the men reembarked on the transports. The next morning, transports disembarked other troops. The swampy terrain and enemy heavy artillery fire forced them to retire. The gunboats opened fire again, about 3 p.m. on May 1, causing some damage. Later, the boats' fire slackened and stopped altogether after dark. Sherman had received orders to land his troops at Milliken's Bend, so the gunboats returned to their anchorages at the mouth of the Yazoo.

Notes

References
 National Park Service battle description
 CWSAC Report Update

Snyder's Bluff
Snyder's Bluff
Snyder's Bluff
Snyder's Bluff
History of Warren County, Mississippi
Snyder's Bluff
1863 in Mississippi
April 1863 events
May 1863 events